Sukhdeo Bhagat was the Jharkhand Congress president and MLA in the Jharkhand representing Lohardaga constituency in Lohardaga district. He joined the BJP in 2019 and lost to Congress candidate Rameshwar Oraon in the Jharkhand assembly polls 2019. On 30 January 2022, Bhagat rejoined Congress.

Career
Sukhdeo Bhagat won the Lohardaga seat, defeating BJP-backed All Jharkhand Students Union's (AJSU) candidate Niru Bhagat. He was appointed Jharkhand Congress president in May 2013.

References

Year of birth missing (living people)
Living people
Indian National Congress politicians from Jharkhand
Jharkhand MLAs 2014–2019
Bharatiya Janata Party politicians from Jharkhand